MV Nantucket is a  ferry owned and operated by the Steamship Authority. It was built in 1974 by Belinger Shipyards in Jacksonville, Florida. She serves the islands of Nantucket and Martha's Vineyard. She was named after a 19th-century paddlewheel steamer serving this route, the sidewheeler Nantucket.

References

Ferries of Massachusetts
Martha's Vineyard
Transportation in Dukes County, Massachusetts
Transportation in Nantucket, Massachusetts
1974 ships
1974 in Florida
Ships built in Jacksonville, Florida